Workmans Wood is a wood just to the east of the village of Sheepscombe, in the Cotswolds, Gloucestershire. It is a biological Site of Special Scientific Interest being part of the Cotswold Commons And Beechwoods SSSI. The Wood is part of a designated national nature reserve (NNR).

Significant species

It is of particular importance as one of only three extant sites in Britain for the Red Helleborine Cephalanthera rubra.

A small colony of this plant grows in the centre of the wood. Netting is used to protect the plants from disturbance.

References

External links
 Natural England (SSSI information)
 National Trust

Sites of Special Scientific Interest in Gloucestershire
Nature reserves in Gloucestershire
Forests and woodlands of Gloucestershire
Cotswolds
Painswick